Novant Health is a four-state integrated network of physician clinics, outpatient centers and hospitals. Its network consists of more than 1,600 physicians and 29,000 employees at more than 640 locations, including 15 medical centers and hundreds of outpatient facilities and physician clinics. The organization was formed on 1 July 1997 by the merger of Carolina Medicorp of Winston-Salem, North Carolina and Presbyterian Health Services of Charlotte, North Carolina. Headquartered in Winston-Salem, North Carolina, Novant Health serves more than 4 million patients annually. In 2019, Novant Health was ranked #38 in Forbes' annual ranking of America's Best Employers for Diversity, #3 in Diversity MBA Magazine's annual ranking of Best Places to Work for Women & Diverse Managers, and #6 in North Carolina in Forbes' annual ranking of America's Best Employers by State.

History

Mergers and re-branding
Novant Health announced a new brand in 2013 to bring a unifying business identity to its mix of more than 400 local brands.    The new logo color aubergine represented "excellence" and "warmth."

Reorganization and layoffs
In July 2015, Novant Health concluded a months-long internal reorganization by terminating approximately 2% of its workforce, or about 400 employees. Despite the layoff announcement, officials said in a statement that the health system was "financially healthy" and a year-end report showed it generated a profit of $201.8 million the previous fiscal year.  This was the largest system-wide layoff incident for   the organization since its previous termination of 289 employees in May 2012, which caused picketing and protests associated with the Occupy movement.

St. Jude Children's Research Hospital affiliation
Novant Health announced a new affiliation with St. Jude Children's Research Hospital on 21 April 2015. The St. Jude affiliate clinic is located in Charlotte, North Carolina .  The St. Jude Affiliate Clinic at Novant Health Hemby Children's Hospital provides specialized hematology and oncology care for pediatric patients in North and South Carolina.

Novant Health UVA Health System
Novant Health UVA Health System was formed 1 January 2016, as a new regional partnership between Novant Health and the University of Virginia Health System. This joint operating company was created through the merger of three regional hospitals: UVA Health System Culpeper Hospital, Novant Health Haymarket Medical Center and Novant Health Prince William Medical Center, as well as additional facilities from Novant Health including assisted living, outpatient cancer care, and ambulatory physician clinics. On 1 July 2021, UVA Health became the full owner of Novant Health UVA Health System and the hospitals in Culpeper, Manassas, and Haymarket.

Comprehensive Stroke Center certifications
On 23 June 2017, it was reported that Novant Health Presbyterian Medical Center had achieved a Comprehensive Stroke Center designation from the Joint Commission and American Heart Association, the first hospital in Charlotte, North Carolina with the designation and the second within the Novant Health system. Novant Health Forsyth Medical Center in Winston-Salem, North Carolina was previously designated as a Comprehensive Stroke Center in 2012, and has been re-certified three times. Comprehensive Stroke Center certification recognizes hospitals that meet standards to treat the most complex stroke cases, and is the highest level of stroke certification available.

Inner-market expansion 
Novant Health Mint Hill Medical Center opened in October 2018
, the system's first new hospital campus in several years after more than a decade of planning and construction that was slowed down by the 2008 Great Recession.  The Mint Hill, North Carolina facility opening was the highest profile example of Novant Health's strategy to expand services within its existing markets after several failed ventures into new markets, including the sale of Gaffney Medical Center in Gaffney, SC in 2014, the closure of Franklin Medical Center in Louisburg, NC in 2015, and the terminated acquisition of Memorial Health in Savannah, GA in 2016.

Novant Health has also expanded capacity at its other North Carolina regional facilities including Clemmons, Kernersville, and Huntersville.  In 2018 and 2019, Novant Health made several large real estate purchases for future growth including the former Sears store at Hanes Mall in Winston-Salem, NC, a large medical office building in the SouthPark region of Charlotte, NC, and the Hall Family Farm in the Ballantyne area of south Charlotte for a future medical center.

Novant Health Institute of Innovation & Artificial Intelligence (AI) 
Novant Health announced the launch of the Novant Health Institute of Innovation & Artificial Intelligence (AI) in June 2019. The institute will "focus on the advanced technologies required to provide highly personalized care and accelerated solutions with actionable data and insights for preventative prediction, diagnosis and treatment to Novant Health's patients."

Controversies
In 2021 Novant faced controversy after firing 175 healthcare workers for not taking a mandated COVID 19 vaccine. At the time it was one of the largest-ever mass terminations due to a vaccine mandate 

In late October 2021, a jury awarded a previous Novant white male executive $10 million for being fired due to his race and sex as a result of a goal of increasing diversity representation. Novant claimed that he was fired due to subpar performance.

Hospitals
North Carolina
Novant Health Brunswick Medical Center 
Novant Health Charlotte Orthopedic Hospital
Novant Health Clemmons Medical Center 
Novant Health Forsyth Medical Center
Novant Health Hemby Children's Hospital 
Novant Health Huntersville Medical Center 
Novant Health Kernersville Medical Center 
Novant Health Matthews Medical Center 
Novant Health Medical Park Hospital 
Novant Health Mint Hill Medical Center
Novant Health Presbyterian Medical Center
Novant Health Rehabilitation Hospital, an affiliate of Encompass Health
Novant Health Rowan Medical Center
Novant Health Thomasville Medical Center
Novant New Hanover Regional Medical Center
New Hanover Regional Medical Center is a hospital in Wilmington, North Carolina. It was established in 1967 as a public hospital, and it was the first hospital in the city to admit patients of all races. It was operated by New Hanover County. In February 2021 Novant acquired the hospital.

Novant Health Presbyterian Medical Center 

Novant Health Presbyterian Medical Center is a 654-bed hospital in Charlotte, North Carolina.   The hospital is accredited by the Joint Commission on Accreditation of Healthcare Organizations and received Magnet designation from the American Nurses Credentialing Center (ANCC)

Presbyterian Hospital was founded in 1903, when ten doctors from the North Carolina Medical College purchased the former Charlotte Private Hospital, and turned it over to the city's six Presbyterian churches to operate. The hospital operated out of leased properties during its early years. In 1915, the nearby Elizabeth College moved to Virginia, vacating its campus on Hawthorne Lane. The hospital acquired that property and in 1918 began operating at its current location. The first of several new buildings opened in 1940, and in 1980 the Elizabeth College buildings came down to make way for further expansion. It opened several satellite hospitals in Huntersville and Matthews, before merging with Carolina Medicorp of Winston-Salem in 1997. The combined company became known as Novant Health, and in 2013 announced the re-branding all of facilities under the Novant name.

Trauma Center 
In June 2017, Novant Health Presbyterian Medical Center received approval from the North Carolina Office of Emergency Medical Services as a "practicing Level II trauma center." The hospital was previously designated as a Level III trauma center in 2016. To qualify for the full Level II designation, the hospital must care for 1,200 trauma patients in the year following the practicing designation and be evaluated on physician response times and patient outcomes.

As part of its trauma program, Novant Health launched a medical transport helicopter in November 2017 in partnership with the Med-Trans Air Medical Transport network. Novant Health MedFlight, an Airbus Eurocopter EC135, is based at Novant Health Rowan Medical Center in Salisbury, North Carolina and transports patients within a 150 nautical-mile radius.

Hemby Children's Hospital
Hemby Children's Hospital,  located within Novant Health Presbyterian Medical Center, has a total of 109 beds including a 38-bed Level IV NICU, an 8-bed PICU, 20-bed adolescent behavioral health department, and a 43-bed general pediatric floor.

Awards and accolades
Presbyterian Medical Center has been named one of the 50 “Best Hospitals” in America by Becker's ASC Review.

In 2010, it received a three-star rating for cardiac surgical care from the Society of Thoracic Surgeons.

In 2009 The American College of Surgeons National Surgical Quality Improvement Program (ACS NSQIP) has recognized Presbyterian Hospital as one of  26 ACS NSQIP participating hospitals in the United States with exemplary outcomes for surgical patient care.

Novant Health Rowan Medical Center

Novant Health Rowan Medical Center, is  a 268-bed hospital in Salisbury, North Carolina.

It first opened in Salisbury as Rowan Memorial Hospital on 1 August 1936. Since then, it has expanded several times. In 1995, it became part of Novant under its current name.

Awards/patient satisfaction
Novant Health Rowan Medical Center is among only 28 hospitals nationwide to be awarded the 2011 Leadership Award for Clinical Excellence from VHA Inc. 
In 2011, it received re-certification as a primary stroke center from the Joint Commission.

References

External links
Novant Health
Novant Health UVA Health System

 
Hospital networks in the United States
Hospitals established in 1997
1997 establishments in North Carolina
Medical and health organizations based in North Carolina
Companies based in Winston-Salem, North Carolina